The Communist Party of Turkestan was the Turkestani branch of the Communist Party of the Soviet Union. It was formed in June 1918. At the time of its formation, the party was joined by a large section of Jadids.

In the spring of 1919 the RCP(b) leadership stressed "particular care and attention" toward "the remnants of national feelings of the toiling masses of the oppressed or dependent nations." Thus the Muslim Bureau (Musbiuro) of the Territorial Committee of the Communist Party of Turkestan was formed. Turar Rïsqulov, a Kazakh from Awliya Ata, was elected as the Chairman of Musbiuro.

In 1920 the 5th Territorial Congress of the Communist Party of Turkestan was held. The congress suggested that a unified Turkic Soviet Republic be formed, a demand that was later ignored by the RCP(b).

In line with the line of attracting the Muslim masses to the party, the party employed different criteria on religious activities of Muslim and Orthodox members. In 1922, 1500 Russian Orthodox were purged from the Communist Party of Turkestan on the grounds of 'religious prejudice', but not a single Muslim.

In 1924 the Communist Party of Turkestan was dissolved, as the boundaries of Soviet Central Asia were re-drawn.

Ethnic composition
As of 1922, the party membership was composed of:

References

Works cited
 

1918 establishments in Russia
1924 disestablishments in the Soviet Union
Turkestan
Communist parties in the Soviet Union
Political parties established in 1918
Parties of one-party systems
Turkestan
Political parties disestablished in 1924